Arcade Classics is a Genesis/Mega Drive compilation of three Atari, Inc. arcade video games: Pong, Missile Command, and Centipede, plus a revised version of each one. It was published in 1996 by Sega. A version was also released for the Game Gear, with Ultrapong replacing Pong.

Reception

Arcade Classics was panned by critics. Reviews commented that Arcade Classics includes very few games compared to other retro compilations, that it fails to recreate the experience the games offered in the arcades, that the "enhanced" versions offer nothing but mild cosmetic changes, and that the overly "busy" backgrounds in the enhanced version of Centipede interfere with the gameplay.

References

1996 video games
Sega Genesis games
Game Gear games
Atari video game compilations
Video games developed in the United States
Multiplayer and single-player video games